Frederick Heap (12 October 1897–1981) was an English footballer who played in the Football League for Bury.

References

1897 births
1981 deaths
English footballers
Association football defenders
English Football League players
Rochdale A.F.C. players
Bury F.C. players